Bojan Mohar (born September 21, 1956) is a Slovenian and Canadian mathematician, working in graph theory. He is a professor of mathematics at the University of Ljubljana and the holder of a Canada Research Chair in graph theory at Simon Fraser University in Vancouver, British Columbia, Canada.

Education
Mohar received his PhD from the University of Ljubljana in 1986, under the supervision of Tomo Pisanski.

Research
Mohar's research concerns topological graph theory, algebraic graph theory, graph minors, and graph coloring.

With Carsten Thomassen he is the co-author of the book Graphs on Surfaces (Johns Hopkins University Press, 2001).

Books

Awards and honors
Mohar was a Fulbright visiting scholar at Ohio State University in 1988, and won the Boris Kidrič prize of the Socialist Republic of Slovenia in 1990. He has been a member of the Slovenian Academy of Engineering since 1999.
He was named a SIAM Fellow in 2018.
He was elected as a Fellow of the American Mathematical Society in the 2020 Class, for "contributions to topological graph theory, including the theory of graph embedding algorithms, graph coloring and crossing numbers, and for service to the profession".

References

External links
Home page at U. Ljubljana

Living people
21st-century Slovenian mathematicians
20th-century Slovenian mathematicians
Graph theorists
Canada Research Chairs
University of Ljubljana alumni
Academic staff of Simon Fraser University
Academic staff of the University of Ljubljana
Fellows of the American Mathematical Society
Fellows of the Society for Industrial and Applied Mathematics
1956 births